William Lewis Baird (July 29, 1843 – July 7, 1916) was a Massachusetts politician who served as the 19th Mayor of Lynn, Massachusetts.

Notes

1843 births
1916 deaths
People of Massachusetts in the American Civil War
Mayors of Lynn, Massachusetts
Lynn, Massachusetts City Council members
Massachusetts Republicans